Boat Harbour is the name of various localities:

Boat Harbour Beach, Tasmania, Australia
Boat Harbour, Tasmania, Australia
Boat Harbour, New South Wales, Australia
Boat Harbour (Kurnell), Sydney, Australia
Boat Harbour, Newfoundland and Labrador, Canada
Boat Harbour, Nova Scotia, Canada
Boat Harbour, South Georgia, South Georgia and the South Sandwich Islands
Boat Harbour, Western Australia, near Denmark, Western Australia
Boat Harbour West 37, Nova Scotia, Canada

See also
Marina